Kelly Clark (born 1983) is an American snowboarder.

Kelly Clark may also refer to:

Kelly Clark (footballer) (born 1994), Scottish footballer (Celtic, national team)
Kelly Clark (lawyer) (1957–2013), American lawyer and state representative in Oregon
Kelly Clark (Canadian politician), a Progressive Conservative Party candidate for the Provencher district in Manitoba in the 1993 Canadian federal election
Kelly J. Clark, American physician and psychiatrist
Kelly James Clark (born 1956), an American philosopher